Erlend Apneseth (born 11 August 1990) is a hardingfele player from Jølster in Sogn og Fjordane.

Biography 

Apneseth is known for his critically acclaimed albums on HUBRO / Grappa, with his trio featuring drummer Øyvind Hegg-Lunde (drums, percussion) and Stephan Meidell (guitar, electronics), as well as his own solo-projects. 
He has written music for cinema, theatre, dance performances, poetry, and musical ensembles and orchestras in different genres. As a soloist he has appeared with Bergen Filharmoniske Orkester and The Norwegian Chamber Orchestra among others. He has received several awards, such as Gammleng-prisen, Øyvind Berghs Minnepris and the Folkelarm-award. Erlend Apneseth Trio`s album «Salika, Molika», featurering accordionist Frode Haltli, received both the NOPA prize and Spellemannprisen, and was nominated for the Nordic Music Prize 2020.

Honors 
 2012: Grappa Music debutant award
 2013: Fureprisen (2013)
 2014: Øivind Bergh memorial award
 2014: Music Scholarship from Sparebanken Vest
 2014: Ingerid, Synnøve and Elias Fegerstens foundation for the Norwegian composers and performing musicians
 2016: Folkelarm-award for Det Andre Rommet 
 2016: Nominated for Spellemannprisen Det Andre Rommet
 2017: Nominated for Spellemannprisen Nattsongar
 2017: Nominated for Spellemannprisen Åra
 2018: Gammleng-prisen 
 2018: NOPA-award 2018 Salika, Molika
 2019: Nominated for Folkelarm-award 2019 for Salika, Molika (with Frode Haltli)
 2019: Spellemannprisen 2019 for Salika, Molika
 2019 Forsberg & Aulies legat 2019
 2019 Nominated for Nordic Music Prize 2019 Salika, Molika
 2020 Folkelarm-award 2020 Fragmentaritum

Discography

Solo albums 
 2013: Blikkspor (Grappa) 
 2016: Det Andre Rommet (Hubro), with Erlend Apneseth Trio
 2017: Nattsongar (Hubro)
 2017: Åra (Hubro), with Erlend Apneseth Trio
 2019: Salika, Molika (Hubro), with Erlend Apneseth Trio and Frode Haltli
 2019: Fragmentarium (Hubro), Erland Apneseth with an Ensemble
 2021: Lokk (Hubro) Erlend Apneseth Trio

References

External links 
 

Norwegian fiddlers
Norwegian musicians
Grappa Music artists
Hubro Music artists
People from Jølster
Musicians from Kristiansand
1990 births
Living people
21st-century violinists